Guillaume Raoux (born 14 February 1970) is a retired tennis player from France.

Career
Raoux reached the Wimbledon junior singles final in 1988. He turned professional in 1989.

Pro tour
The right-hander won one singles career title (Queensland Open, 1992), and achieved a career-high singles ranking of world No. 35 in June 1998. Raoux reached the fourth round of the 1998 Australian Open and the quarterfinals of the Paris Masters in 1990 and 1997.

He was the first man to be beaten by Roger Federer on the ATP Tour.

Raoux represented his native country at the 1996 Summer Olympics in Atlanta where he was defeated in the first round by Zimbabwe's Byron Black.

Junior Grand Slam finals

Singles: 1 (1 runner-up)

ATP career finals

Singles: 5 (1 title, 4 runner-ups)

Doubles: 7 (4 titles, 3 runner-ups)

ATP Challenger and ITF Futures Finals

Singles: 8 (6–2)

Doubles: 4 (4–0)

Performance timelines

Singles

Doubles

References

External links
 
 
 

1970 births
Living people
People from Bagnols-sur-Cèze
French male tennis players
Hopman Cup competitors
Olympic tennis players of France
Tennis players at the 1996 Summer Olympics
Sportspeople from Gard